Baron Von Redberry was a cereal created by General Mills around 1972 that featured a World War I era German pilot, presumably modeled on “Red Baron” Manfred Albrecht Freiherr von Richthofen. The cereal itself consisted of berry-flavored oat cereal with sweet berry marshmallows and tasted strongly of fruit punch.
   
Baron Von Redberry was the nemesis of Sir Grapefellow, mascot of another General Mills cereal brand. In the vein of the cereal rivalries Quisp & Quake and Count Chocula & Franken Berry bickering over which one was better, Redberry would proclaim, "Baron Von Redberry is der berry goodest!" and Grapefellow would counter, "Sir Grapefellow is the grapest!"

See also 

Sir Grapefellow

References

External links
 Photo of Baron Von Redberry box

General Mills characters
Redberry
General Mills cereals
Mascots introduced in 1972
Products introduced in 1972
Fictional aviators
Fictional German military personnel
Male characters in advertising